The 1972 Cleveland Browns season was the team's 23rd season with the National Football League.

Staff

Roster

Season summary 
1972 marked the end of a nine-year span in which the Browns made the playoffs seven times; it would be the Browns' last playoff appearance until 1980.

The 1972 Cleveland Browns not only made it to the postseason as a wild card team with a 10–4 record, but also nearly pulled off what would have been one of the biggest upsets in team and NFL playoff history. Playing in the AFC divisional round in Miami against a Dolphins team that would go 17–0 and win the Super Bowl, the Browns lost 20–14 after blowing a 14–13 lead midway through the fourth quarter.

The Browns started the year with veteran quarterback Bill Nelsen as their starter; Nelsen had arrived from the Pittsburgh Steelers in a 1968 trade. But Nelsen, who had knee problems, struggled early, and the team followed suit by getting off to a rocky 2–3 start. The move was made to start Mike Phipps, drafted in 1970 with the No.3 overall pick the Browns obtained by trading Pro Football Hall of Fame wide receiver Paul Warfield to Miami. Although Phipps didn't have a very good year statistically—he completed only 47.2 percent of his passes and threw for just 13 touchdowns with 16 interceptions—he was able to make plays when he had to.

The Browns were only 2–3 and had been outscored 48–7 in their last two games, and 74–17 in their three losses, before a six-game winning streak ensued. Included in the streak was a last-second, 26–24 comeback win at home over the Steelers, who were trying to win the AFC Central title and make the playoffs for the second time in franchise history and first time since 1947. The Browns finished second to the Steelers (11–3) by a game after winning eight of their last nine contests, the only loss being a 30–0 decision in the rematch in Pittsburgh. The Browns also turned back the Denver Broncos on the road 27–20.

Pro Football Hall of Fame running back Leroy Kelly, in his last productive season, rushed for 811 yards. Wide receiver Frank Pitts led the team in receptions with 36, good for eight touchdowns—or 62 percent of the team total of 13. But it was primarily the defense that saved the season for the Browns. The unit gave up over 30 points only twice all year, posted a shutout and kept foes to 17 points or less eight times.

Exhibition schedule

Schedule

Note: Intra-division opponents are in bold text.

Postseason

Standings

References

External links 
 1972 Cleveland Browns at Pro Football Reference
 1972 Cleveland Browns Statistics at jt-sw.com
 1972 Cleveland Browns Schedule at jt-sw.com
 1972 Cleveland Browns at DatabaseFootball.com  

Cleveland
Cleveland Browns seasons
Cleveland Browns